The 2018 U.S. National Gymnastics Championships is the 55th edition of the U.S. National Gymnastics Championships. The competition was held from August 16–19, 2018 at the TD Garden in Boston, Massachusetts.

Competition schedule 

The competition featured Senior and Junior competitions for both women's and men's disciplines. The competition was as follows:

 Thursday, August 16: Men's gymnastics – 1:30 p.m., juniors, and 7:30 p.m., seniors
 Friday, August 17: Women's gymnastics – 1:30 p.m., juniors, and 7:30 p.m., seniors
 Saturday, August 18: Men's gymnastics – 10:30 a.m., juniors, and 3:30 p.m., seniors
 Sunday, August 19: Women's gymnastics – 1:30 p.m., juniors, and 7:30 p.m., seniors

Sponsorship 

Procter & Gamble, a multinational consumer goods company and sponsor of the previous National Championships ended their sponsorship in late 2017.

Medalists

Women's national team
The top 6 all-around females automatically made the national team. For seniors, this consisted of Simone Biles, Morgan Hurd, Riley McCusker, Grace McCallum, Shilese Jones, and Jade Carey.  Additionally, 7th and 8th place finishers, Kara Eaker and Trinity Thomas, were also named to the team.  For juniors, Leanne Wong, Kayla DiCello, Sunisa Lee, Skye Blakely, Konnor McClain, and Olivia Greaves were the top 6 finishers.

Participants 
The following individuals are participating in competition:

Seniors

 Shania Adams – Plain City, Ohio (Buckeye Gymnastics)
 Simone Biles – Spring, Texas (World Champions Centre)
 Sloane Blakely – Frisco, Texas (WOGA)
 Luisa Blanco – Little Elm, Texas (WOGA)
 Jade Carey – Phoenix, Arizona (Arizona Sunrays)
 Jordan Chiles – Vancouver, Washington (Naydenov)
 Audrey Davis – Frisco, Texas (WOGA)
 Olivia Dunne – Hillsdale, New Jersey (ENA Paramus)
 Kara Eaker – Grain Valley, Missouri (GAGE)
 Margzetta Frazier – Sicklerville, New Jersey (UCLA)
 Jaylene Gilstrap – McKinney, Texas (Metroplex)
 Morgan Hurd – Middletown, Delaware (First State)
 Maddie Johnston – Boyds, Maryland (Hill's Gymnastics)
 Shilese Jones – Westerville, Ohio (Future Gymnastics Academy)
 Adeline Kenlin – Iowa City, Iowa (IGN)
  – Flower Mound, Texas (Texas Dreams)
 Grace McCallum – Isanti, Minnesota (Twin City Twisters)
 Riley McCusker – Brielle, New Jersey (MG Elite)
  – Las Vegas, Nevada (Salcianu Elite)
 Alyona Shchennikova – Evergreen, Colorado (5280)
 Ragan Smith – Lewisville, Texas (Texas Dreams)
 Deanne Soza – Coppell, Texas (Texas Dreams)
 Trinity Thomas – York, Pennsylvania (Prestige)
  – Vacaville, California (San Mateo)

Juniors

 Ciena Alipio – San Jose, California (West Valley Gymnastics)
 Sydney Barros – Lewisville, Texas (Texas Dreams)
 Skye Blakely – Frisco, Texas (WOGA)
 Jordan Bowers – Lincoln, Nebraska (Solid Rock)
  – Houston, Texas (Discover)
 Kailin Chio – Henderson, Nevada (Gymcats)
 Claire Dean – Piedmont, California (Head Over Heels)
 Kayla DiCello – Boyds, Maryland (Hill's Gymnastics)
 Aleah Finnegan – Lee's Summit, Missouri (GAGE)
 Karis German – Spring, Texas (World Champions Centre)
 Zoe Gravier – Holmdel, New Jersey (MG Elite)
 Olivia Greaves – Staten Island, New York (MG Elite)
 Selena Harris – Henderson, Nevada (Gymcats)
 Alexis Jeffrey – Warrensburg, Missouri (GAGE)
 Levi Jung-Ruivivar – Woodland Hills, California (Paramount Elite)
 Sunisa Lee – St. Paul, Minnesota (Midwest Gymnastics Center)
 Lilly Lippeatt – Mason, Ohio (Cincinnati Gymnastics) 
 Konnor McClain – Cross Lanes, West Virginia (Revolution)
 Sydney Morris – Bowie, Maryland (First State)
 Brenna Neault – Rancho Cucamonga, California (Precision)
 Katelyn Rosen – Boerne, Texas (Mavericks at Artemovs)
 JaFree Scott – Independence, Missouri (GAGE)
  – Belmont, California (San Mateo)
 Tori Tatum – Chanhassen, Minnesota (Twin City Twisters)
 Leanne Wong – Overland Park, Kansas (GAGE)

References 

U.S. National Gymnastics Championships
Gymnastics in Massachusetts
Sports competitions in Boston
U.S. Open
U.S. Open
U.S. Open
2010s in Boston